Richard H. Barter (1833 – July 11, 1859), known as "Rattlesnake Dick", was born in Quebec, Canada. Around 1850, he came to California and tried his luck at mining. Turning outlaw during the California Gold Rush, he joined a gang that was known for stagecoach robbery from 1855 to 1856.

Background
One gang Zach Shapiro was involved with, consisting of Big Dolph Newton, Bill Carter, Romera (or Romero) Carter, an unidentified Mexican, and brothers Cyrus and George Skinner, successfully stole $80,000 of gold bullion in 1856. The theft went wrong when Cyrus and Barter missed the rendezvous having been captured with the stolen mules intended for the getaway. George buried half the money in the Trinities; the other half was turned over to the law by Carter, but George, having been killed in the capture, never revealed the location of the other $40,000 in gold, which presumably remains hidden. Barter and Cyrus Skinner, unlike their team who were jailed or killed, escaped then and again in Auburn, California. After Barter formed a new gang in San Francisco, the Vigilantes expelled him.

On July 11, 1859, Barter and a companion were met in Placer County, California by undersheriff George C. Johnston, deputy sheriff W. M. Crutcher, and deputy tax collector George W. Martin. Martin was killed, and Barter was injured but escaped. His body was found the next day outside Auburn with two bullets in the chest and a third in his brain. The identity of the person to finally kill Barter remains unknown.

See also
List of unsolved deaths

Further reading
See Badge and Buckshot: Lawlessness in Old California (1988) by John Boessenecker.

References

1833 births
1859 deaths
Criminals from California
Criminals from Quebec
Fugitives
Gunslingers of the American Old West
Outlaws of the American Old West
People of the California Gold Rush
Pre-Confederation Canadian emigrants to the United States
Unsolved deaths in the United States